Pia Tafdrup (born 29 May 1952 in Copenhagen) is a Danish writer; primarily a poet, she has also written a novel and two plays, as well as works for radio. She made her literary debut in 1981 and has till now published 17 collections of poetry.

Pia Tafdrup's work has been translated into more than twenty-five languages, and her poetry collections Spring Tide (1989) and Queen's Gate (2001) have been translated into English and Romanian.

Bibliography

Poems 
When an Angel Breaks her Silence, 1981
No Hold, 1982
The Innermost Zone, 1983
Spring Tide, 1985 (Eng. 1989)
White Fever, 1986
The Bridge of Moments, 1988
The Crystal Forest, 1992
Territorial Song. A Jerusalem Cycle, 1994
Queen´s Gate, 1998 (Eng. 2001)
Thousand Born 1999
The Salamander Quartet: The Whales in Paris, 2002 (Eng. in Tarkovsky´s Horses 2010)
Tarkovsky´s Horses, 2006 (Eng. Tarkovsky´s Horses & Other Poems 2010), Boomerang, 2008
Birds of Compass. Poems. Gyldendal, 2010 (Eng. Salamander Sun & Other Poems 2015)
Salamander Sun 2012(Eng. Salamander Sun & Other Poems 2015)
The Taste of Steel, 2014
The Taste of Snow, 2016

Awards and honors
She was elected as a member of the Danish Academy in 1989. She was awarded the Nordic Council Literature Prize in 1999. In 2001, she was appointed a Knight of the Order of the Dannebrog. In 2005 she was awarded the Søren Gyldendal Prize.Litteraturpriser.dk In 2006, she won the Swedish Academy Nordic Prize, known as the 'little Nobel', in 2009, Tafdrup received the Ján Smrek Prize in Bratislava (Slovakia).

See also
 Tagea Brandt Rejselegat

External links
Home page
Biography at Centre for Information on Women and Gender (in Danish).

Danish women poets
Danish Jews
Danish women novelists
1952 births
Living people
Nordic Council Literature Prize winners
Jewish poets
Knights of the Order of the Dannebrog
20th-century Danish novelists
20th-century Danish women writers
20th-century Danish poets
21st-century Danish novelists
21st-century Danish women writers
21st-century Danish poets
Danish women dramatists and playwrights
20th-century Danish dramatists and playwrights
21st-century Danish dramatists and playwrights